Jacob the Monk was a 6th-century monk who was an important early figure in European Christianity. He is known from menologia and synaxaria of the Church of Constantinople, where he is mentioned for October 9 or 10. A Syriac manuscript is held by the British Museum.

References

6th-century Christian monks